Sir Glen Gardner Pearson (19 February 1907 – 30 November 1976) was an Australian politician who represented the South Australian House of Assembly seat of Flinders from 1951 to 1970 for the Liberal and Country League. He served as Treasurer of South Australia from 1968 to 1970.

References

 

1907 births
1976 deaths
Australian Knights Bachelor
Australian politicians awarded knighthoods
Members of the South Australian House of Assembly
Liberal and Country League politicians
20th-century Australian politicians
Treasurers of South Australia